Charles Best may refer to:

 Charles Best (poet) (1570–1627), English poet
 Charles Best (British Army officer) (1765–1836), British army officer
 Charles Herbert Best (1899–1978), American-Canadian medical scientist and co-discoverer of insulin
 Charles Best (politician) (1909–1996), Australian politician
 Charles Alexander Best (1931–1978), Canadian politician, son of Charles Herbert Best
 Charles Best (American football) (1874–1962), American college football and basketball coach
 Charles Best (businessman), American businessman and founder of Donorschoose.org